Bandboy (also expressed as band boy) is a bygone term for a job similar to for what now is known as a "roadie."  They set up, tear down, and maintain equipment, and music.  They help-out backstage, making sure there are towels, drinks, ice.

Unlike a roadie, the bandboy was more like a personal assistant, or au pair, or butler/dresser for the leader — making sure suits were dry cleaned, shoes shined, and the like.  On foreign tours a local "bandboy" would translate, find places to eat, change money, buy train tickets, and so on.  Often the "bandboy" would disseminate information for the leader, hand out itineraries, room lists, and set lists.  The role of bandboy was different with every band and had different duties than the more senior road manager, who dealt with promoters, booking agents, contracts, payroll, catering, and such.  When times got tough, financially, road managers often performed bandboy duties — or band members themselves handled the bandboy duties.

Notable bandboy alumni 
 Simon Napier-Bell
 Popsie Randolph, Benny Goodman
 George A. "Bullets" Durgom (1915–1992), Tommy Dorsey 
 Morris I. (Moishe) Diamond (born 1921), Tommy Dorsey: 1940–1942
 Nifty Vickerson, Frank Sinatra
 Henry Snodgrass, Count Basie
 Willie Bobo, Machito's Afro-Cubans: 1947
 Fred Charap, Count Basie
 Jimmy Thomason (born 1919), Cliff Bruner
 Coke Escovedo, Tito Puente
 Ken Fujiwara, Count Basie, Japan tour: 1980s
 Bob "Little Gate" Walker, Bunny Berigan
 Bernard Arthurneal (Bernie) Mackey (1909–1980), Bunny Berigan
 Edward F. Gabel (1924–2014), Stan Kenton (left Kenton as bandboy to work for Earle Spencer as manager in 1947)

See also 
 Road crew

References 

Occupations in music
Musical terminology
Jazz terminology